The Cincinnati Rugby Football Club, nicknamed the Wolfhounds, is an American rugby union team based in Cincinnati, Ohio. The flagship team plays in the Midwest Rugby Premiership and additional teams playing in Division II and in the USA Rugby Club 7s for Men and Women.

History
The club was founded in 1974. It currently fields competitive teams in Midwest's Division 1 and Club Sevens for both, men's and women's. Since their inception, the Wolfhounds remain one of only two teams in the Midwest Rugby Union to compete in Division I for their entire history.

References

External links
 

American rugby union teams
Rugby clubs established in 1974
Sports teams in Cincinnati
1974 establishments in Ohio